Imagining Argentina (1987) is a novel by American author Lawrence Thornton, about the Dirty War in 1970s Argentina, during which the military government abducted and "disappeared" suspected opposition activists. It was nominated for the PEN/Faulkner Award for Fiction.

Plot summary
Cecilia, a dissident journalist in Buenos Aires, is kidnapped by the secret police, likely to join the ranks of the "disappeared." The city is the center of opposition to the military dictatorship during its Dirty War in the 1970s against opponents. Her husband Carlos, a theater director, searches frantically for her and others through "imagining" their fates in prisons and cells.

Reception
The novel was highly praised. It was nominated for the PEN/Faulkner Award for Fiction.

Adaptations
In 2003, the novel was adapted as a film of the same name, written and directed by British playwright and director Christopher Hampton.

References

American novels adapted into films
1987 American novels
Novels set in Buenos Aires
Novels about journalists
Novels set in the 1970s
Doubleday (publisher) books
PEN/Faulkner Award for Fiction-winning works
Hemingway Foundation/PEN Award-winning works